This article is about the campaign of Clube Atlético Juventus in 2007, a football club based in São Paulo, São Paulo state, Brazil. For an overview of the club, see Clube Atlético Juventus.

Campeonato Paulista

17/01 - 16:00(GMT-0200) Juventus 3 x 0 Rio Branco
21/01 - 17:00(GMT-0200) Bragantino 3 x 0 Juventus
24/01 - 21:45(GMT-0200) Juventus 1 x 4 Corinthians
27/01 - 16:00(GMT-0200) Juventus 0 x 1 América
31/01 - 20:30(GMT-0200) São Bento 1 x 1 Juventus
03/02 - 16:00(GMT-0200) Juventus 1 x 0 Ponte Preta
07/02 - 19:30(GMT-0200) São Caetano 2 x 0 Juventus
10/02 - 16:00(GMT-0200) Juventus 0 x 1 Barueri
17/02 - 16:00(GMT-0200) Juventus 2 x 2 Marília
25/02 - 16:00(GMT-0200) Rio Claro 1 x 0 Juventus
03/03 - 18:10(GMT-0300) Juventus 0 x 2 São Paulo
07/03 - 15:00(GMT-0300) Juventus 1 x 0 Sertãozinho
10/03 - 16:00(GMT-0300) Palmeiras 4 x 1 Juventus
17/03 - 16:00(GMT-0300) Guaratinguetá 3 x 1 Juventus
24/03 - 15:00(GMT-0300) Juventus 2 x 0 Ituano
28/03 - 20:30(GMT-0300) Santo André 1 x 2 Juventus
30/03 - 16:00(GMT-0300) Noroeste 3 x 1 Juventus
07/04 - 15:00(GMT-0300) Juventus 2 x 1 Paulista
11/04 - 21:45(GMT-0300) Santos 2 x 0 Juventus

Campeonato Brasileiro Série C

07/07 - 15:00(GMT-0300) Juventus 1 x 1 Democrata GV/MG
15/07 - 16:00(GMT-0300) Madureira/RJ 0 x 0 Juventus
18/07 - 15:00(GMT-0300) Juventus 1 x 1  Villa Nova/MG
22/07 - 16:00(GMT-0300) Villa Nova/MG 0 x 0 Juventus
29/07 - 15:00(GMT-0300) Juventus 1 x 0 Madureira/RJ
05/08 - 16:00(GMT-0300) Democrata GV/MG  0 x 0 Juventus

Copa FPF

15/07 - 15:00(GMT-0300) Juventus 0 x 2 Guaratinguetá
25/07 - 15:00(GMT-0300) São Bernardo 1 x 2 Juventus
28/07 - 16:00(GMT-0300) Bragantino 0 x 0 Juventus
01/08 - 15:00(GMT-0300) Juventus 3 x 0 União FC Mogi das Cruzes
05/08 - 10:00(GMT-0300) Corinthians 0 x 0 Juventus
11/08 - 15:00(GMT-0300) Juventus 2 x 0 São José EC
18/08 - 15:00(GMT-0300) Guaratinguetá 1 x 0 Juventus
19/08 - 15:00(GMT-0300) Juventus 4 x 2 São Bernardo
01/09 - 15:00(GMT-0300) Juventus 2 x 0 Bragantino
05/09 - 20:30(GMT-0300) União FC Mogi das Cruzes 0 x 2 Juventus
08/09 - 15:00(GMT-0300) Juventus 2 x 2 Corinthians
16/09 - 11:00(GMT-0300) São José EC 2 x 1 Juventus
23/09 - 11:00(GMT-0300) Paulista 2 x 4 Juventus
26/09 - 15:00(GMT-0300) Juventus 3 x 1 XV de Piracicaba
30/09 - 10:00(GMT-0300) Marília 2 x 1 Juventus
07/10 - 10:00(GMT-0300) Juventus 2 x 0 Marília
10/10 - 20:30(GMT-0300) XV de Piracicaba 0 x 4 Juventus
14/10 - 11:00(GMT-0200) Juventus 3 x 0 Paulista
20/10 - 19:00(GMT-0200) Olímpia 2 x 3 Juventus
27/10 - 16:00(GMT-0200) Juventus 2 x 1 Olímpia
03/11 - 16:00(GMT-0200) Juventus 2 x 0 Mogi Mirim
11/11 - 11:00(GMT-0200) Mogi Mirim  1 x  0 Juventus
17/11 - 19:00(GMT-0200) Linense 1 x 2 Juventus
25/11 - 10:00(GMT-0200) Juventus 2 x 3 Linense

Recopa Sul-Brasileira

05/12 - 16:00(GMT-0300) Marcílio Dias/SC 4 x 1 Juventus

References

Federação Paulista de Futebol

Clube Atlético Juventus seasons
Juventus